Suqovuşan (also, Suqovşan, Sukovushan,  Sugovshan) is a village and municipality in the Sabirabad Rayon of Azerbaijan.  It has a population of 2,133.

References 

Populated places in Sabirabad District